Charles Cordiner (–1794) was a Scottish Episcopal clergyman and antiquary.

Life 
Charles Cordiner became Episcopalian minister of St Andrew's Chapel, Banff, in 1769. He became known as a writer on antiquities. He died at Banff on 18 November 1794, aged forty-eight, leaving a widow and eight children. James Cordiner was his son.

Works 

He was the author of Antiquities and Scenery of the North of Scotland, in a series of Letters to Thomas Pennant, London, 1780; and Remarkable Ruins and Romantic Prospects of North Britain, with Ancient Monuments and singular subjects of Natural History, 2 vols. London, 1788–95. This last work, which is illustrated with engravings by Peter Mazell, was published in parts, but Cordiner did not live to see the publication of the last part.

Gallery

References

Sources 

 Smitten, Jeffrey R. (2004). "Cordiner, Charles (1746?–1794), Scottish Episcopal clergyman and antiquary". Oxford Dictionary of National Biography. Oxford UP. Retrieved 7 September 2022.
Attribution:

External links 
 "Rev Charles Cordiner". The British Museum. Retrieved 7 September 2022.
 "The Rev. Charles Cordiner [(?1746-1794) antiquary] at Banff …". The National Archives. Retrieved 7 September 2022.

1740s births
1794 deaths
18th-century antiquarians
18th-century Scottish Episcopalian priests
18th-century Scottish writers
Scottish antiquarians
Year of birth uncertain